Rhadi Ben Abdesselam (28 February 1929 – 4 October 2000) was a Moroccan long-distance runner. He competed at the 1960 Olympics in the marathon and 10,000 meters events.

He also ran in the International Cross Country Championships in 1958–1963. In March 1960, he and Belgium's Gaston Roelants quickly broke away from the field, and he became the first African athlete to win the individual gold medal in that event, defeating Roelants by 40 yards.

On September 8, 1960, he finished in 14th place in the finals-only 10,000 meters, in 29:32.0, almost a minute behind the winner, the Soviet Union's Pyotr Bolotnikov, who broke the Olympic record for the event.

Just two days later, the blazing pace through the first 20 kilometers in the marathon helped result in an eventual world record for the barefoot winner, Ethiopia's Abebe Bikila. After they dispatched the rest of the field by 25 kilometers, the leading pair stayed stride-for-stride until the final 500 meters, with Ben Abdesselam finishing a close second in 2:15:41.6, 25.4 seconds behind Abebe's new world record. Abebe's mark trimmed 8/10ths of a second off Sergei Popov's world record of 2:15:17.0, set in 1958. Ironically, Abebe had been advised to watch out for Ben Abdesselam, but the latter wore his 10,000 meter competition number, so Abebe was unaware of the identity of his pursuer. Popov finished 5th in Rome, two minutes behind New Zealand's Barry Magee, who took the bronze medal.

1960 Olympic Marathon You Tube video
Légende du Sport Marocain: Feu Abdeslam Radi

References

1929 births
2000 deaths
People from Errachidia
Moroccan male long-distance runners
Moroccan male marathon runners
Olympic athletes of Morocco
Olympic silver medalists for Morocco
Athletes (track and field) at the 1960 Summer Olympics
International Cross Country Championships winners
Medalists at the 1960 Summer Olympics
Olympic silver medalists in athletics (track and field)
20th-century Moroccan people